PalaTrieste, or Allianz Dome for sponsorship reasons, officially known as Palazzo dello sport Cesare Rubini is an indoor sporting arena located in Trieste, Italy. Opened in 1999, it has a seating capacity for 6,943 people and is currently home for Pallacanestro Trieste basketball team.

History

Allianz sponsorship
All started when, in 2015, Allianz became new top sponsor of the Italian basketball team Pallacanestro Trieste, based in PalaTrieste.

In 2017, the German insurance company sponsored a new parquet basketball court, and later in 2018, a new scoreboard called Allianz Wall was installed in the Trieste arena.

In 2018 Allianz signed a deal to become new title sponsor of the arena, so PalaTrieste officially became Allianz Dome until 2023.

Gallery

See also
 List of indoor arenas
 List of basketball arenas

References

External links
Photo of the arena under construction

Basketball venues in Italy
Indoor arenas in Italy
Pallacanestro Trieste
Sports venues in Italy
Sports venues completed in 1999
1999 establishments in Italy